Joseph Francis Wilkinson (born 2 November 1995) is an English professional footballer.

Club career
Born in Dewsbury, Wilkinson made his professional début for Huddersfield Town playing in an unfamiliar position of right-back in a 2–2 Football League Championship draw against Blackburn Rovers.

In March 2016 he joined Bradford Park Avenue on a youth loan.

Following his release from Huddersfield Town he had spells at Buxton and Liversedge before signing for Ossett Albion in August 2017.

References

External links

Huddersfield Town profile

1995 births
Living people
Association football defenders
Bradford (Park Avenue) A.F.C. players
English Football League players
English footballers
Footballers from Dewsbury
Huddersfield Town A.F.C. players
Hyde United F.C. players